The Callanish II stone circle is one of many megalithic structures around the better-known (and larger) Calanais I on the west coast of the Isle of Lewis, in the Outer Hebrides, Scotland.

Description
Callanish II is situated on a ridge just 90 metres from the waters of Loch Roag. It is just a few hundred metres from the Callanish III stone circle. See also Callanish IV, Callanish VIII and Callanish X for other minor sites.

The stone circle consists of thin standing stones arranged in the shape of an ellipse measuring 21.6 by 18.9 metres. Five of the stones are standing and two have fallen. The stones vary from 2 to 3.3 metres in height. A slab, 1.4 metres long, lies in front of the western stone, pointing towards the centre of the circle. The stone circle surrounds a cairn with a diameter of 8.5 metres.

When 3 feet (1 metre) of peat was removed from the site in 1848, four holes were noticed, three grouped in an arc at the northwest, a fourth at the south-west. Wood charcoal found in them suggests that they formed an earlier timber circle about 10 metres in diameter.

References

External links

 Photos of Callanish II on the Ancient Scotland site

Archaeological sites in the Outer Hebrides
Isle of Lewis
Stone circles in Na h-Eileanan Siar
Scheduled monuments in Scotland